The 1925 St. Xavier Musketeers football team was an American football team that represented St. Xavier College (later renamed Xavier University) in the Ohio Athletic Conference (OAC) during the 1925 college football season. In its sixth season under head coach Joseph A. Meyer, the team compiled a 5–2–1 record (3–1–1 against OAC opponents) and finished in fifth place in the OAC. George Reynolds was the team captain. The team played its home games at Corcoran Field in Cincinnati.

The nickname "Musketeers" was adopted for the football team at the start of the 1925 season. The name was chosen by Father F. J. Finn and was announced in the program for the October 3 game against .

Schedule

References

St. Xavier
Xavier Musketeers football seasons
St. Xavier Musketeers football